Salman Bashir (born 4 March 1952) is a Pakistani diplomat who served as the Foreign Secretary of Pakistan and as the High Commissioner of Pakistan to India.

Early life 
Salman Bashir did his master's degree in History and LLB degree before joining the Foreign Service of Pakistan in February 1976. He belongs to the Third Common Training Program, and he won overall first position in his batch, but preferred to join Foreign Service of Pakistan instead of Pakistan Administrative Service (PAS) or Police service.

Career 
Salman Bashir served in the Ministry of Foreign Affairs as a section officer (1976–1980), Director (1985–1987), Director General (1995–1999) and Additional Foreign Secretary (2003–2005).

His foreign diplomatic assignments included: Pakistan Mission to the United Nations Office at Geneva (1980–1984), Organisation of the Islamic Conference Secretariat, Jeddah (1988–1995), Ambassador of Pakistan to Denmark and Lithuania (July 1999 to February 2003).

Salman Bashir was the Pakistani Ambassador to China and Mongolia from 2005 to 2008. He then replaced Riaz Mohammad Khan as the Foreign Secretary from 3 May  2008  to 3 March 2012. Salman Bashir also served as High Commissioner of Pakistan to India from 2012 to 2014.

Personal life 
Salman Bashir is married with two sons and a daughter. His brother, Admiral Noman Bashir, is the former Chief of Naval Staff of the Pakistan Navy.

References

External links
Biography of Salman Bashir at the Ministry of Foreign Affairs (Pakistan)- Archived

Salman Bashir at Outlook India
Salman Bashir at ThePrint

|-

|-

|-

|-

1952 births
Living people
Foreign Secretaries of Pakistan
Ambassadors of Pakistan to Denmark
Ambassadors of Pakistan to China
Ambassadors of Pakistan to Lithuania
Ambassadors of Pakistan to Mongolia
High Commissioners of Pakistan to India
Army Burn Hall College alumni